Huizar or Huízar is a surname. Notable people with the surname include:

Candelario Huízar (1882–1970), Mexican composer, musician, and music teacher
Guillermo Huízar (born 1961), Mexican politician 
José Huizar (born 1968), Mexican-American politician
Laura Elena Zúñiga Huizar (born 1985), Mexican model and beauty queen